A feature group, in North American telephone industry jargon, is most commonly used to designate various standard means of access by callers to competitive long-distance services.  
They defined switching arrangements from local exchange carriers central offices to interexchange carriers. These arrangements were described in an official tariff of the National Exchange Carrier Association, filed with the Federal Communications Commission (FCC).

While there are other feature groups for local access, the four common feature groups exist for access from the local subscriber to competitive long-distance carriers:
 Feature Group A The original implementation, in which a user has to dial the local telephone number of a provider's gateway, followed by (usually) a password, then the desired long-distance number. There is a different local access number in each local calling area. This requires no special capability at the local telephone company office as competing long-distance providers connected using standard local lines, which may or may not support caller ID. If a carrier has no local presence, a foreign exchange line is used to reach its nearest point of presence. Once the standard means of accessing alternate long-distance carriers, local access numbers are now used primarily for low-cost prepaid calling cards as the calls may be made from any phone, at flat or local rates.
 Feature Group B Associated with 950-XXXX calling; instead of a local telephone number the user enters 950 and 4 additional digits which identify the long-distance carrier. Operation is similar to the local access numbers (feature group A) except that the 950-XXXX access number is the same in every community, NANP-wide. Some exchanges send the caller's number automatically; where this service is not provided or not desired (calling card applications), the 950-XXXX number must be followed by a calling card number and the long-distance destination number. If ANI is provided, calls from the one subscribed line may be made as 950-XXXX and the long-distance destination. Largely deprecated by feature group D, but the 950 prefix and a list of carrier codes remain reserved in all North American area codes, even in Canada where most providers went from feature group A directly to 1+ default carrier dialling and feature group D (101xxxx + destination) calling without ever using 950-XXXX as a primary means to access alternate long-distance carriers from home land lines.
 Feature Group C Rare, originally used by AT&T for operator-assisted coin phones since they allow the operator to keep control of the caller's telephone line until the transaction is completed. As coin-handling for trunk calls is now automated within the phone (like a COCOT, the current generation of coin phones operates self-contained without the central exchange providing coin-call support functions), group 'C' is largely obsolete.
 Feature Group D The current standard, requires the local switch support equal access by competing carriers at the trunk level; highest quality connection, and allows pre-selection of the interexchange carrier by the end-user.  This feature group permits two types of calls.  If a user dials 1 + area code + seven-digit number, the long-distance call is handled by a default carrier chosen by the user.  Alternatively, a user dials 101 + four-digit carrier code + area code + seven-digit number, and the call is handled by the carrier specified by the carrier code. The original batch of carrier codes began with 0, so this type of "dial around" service was typically marketed as dial-around 1010-xxx service. NANPA maintains separate lists of carrier codes for feature groups 'B' and 'D' as not all long-distance providers support both standards.

These Feature Group alternatives allowed the LEC's end users to make long-distance calls using the interexchange carrier's network, when non-stored program-controlled exchanges could not be modified to provide equal access. By the mid 1990s, Equal Access features in exchange software had rendered Feature Group D universally available in modern landline exchanges; the others are either used for calling card applications or are obsolete.

External links

Telephone services
Telephone service enhanced features
United States communications regulation